Elections to Southwark Council were held on 4 May 2006.  The whole council was up for election for the first time since the 2002 election.

Southwark local elections are held every four years, with the next due in 2010. The council remained in no overall control.

Election result

|}

Ward results
* - Existing Councillor seeking re-election.

Brunswick Park

Camberwell Green

Cathedrals

Chaucer

College

Andrew Simmons was a sitting councillor for The Lane ward

East Dulwich

East Walworth

Faraday

Grange

Livesey

Newington

Nunhead

Peckham

Peckham Rye

Aubyn Graham was a sitting councillor for The Lane ward

Riverside

Rotherhithe

South Bermondsey

South Camberwell

William Rowe was a sitting councillor for College ward

Surrey Docks

The Lane

Village

By-Elections 2006-10

The by-election was called following the resignation of Cllr. Paul D. L. Baichoo.

The by-election was called following the death of Cllr. Anne Yates.

References

Council elections in the London Borough of Southwark
2006 London Borough council elections
21st century in the London Borough of Southwark